Robert H. Tamarin is a biologist and author. He  authored the principles of genetics, a textbook in its seventh edition with McGraw-Hill Publishers.
His research interest focuses on evolutionary genetics. He has also developed radioisotope, electrophoretic and DNA fingerprinting techniques for use in the study of small mammal.

Life and career
He obtained a Bachelor of science degree from the City University of New York, Master of science (M.S.) degree from Brooklyn College and a doctorate degree (Ph. D) from Indiana University.
He started his academic career at Boston University after he completed his Postdoctoral Fellowship at National Institutes of Health in the departments of genetics, University of Hawaii and a Ford Foundation Postdoctoral Fellowship in the Department of biology at Princeton University. He is a  well-recognized author of many scientific articles and textbooks such as The Principles of Genetics. Tamarin is a contributor to Science Year, The World Book Annual Supplement.

See also
Frequency-dependent selection

References

American geneticists
American science writers
Living people
Year of birth missing (living people)
Brooklyn College alumni